Shady Grove is an unincorporated community in Jefferson Township, Fayette County, Ohio, United States.

References 

Unincorporated communities in Fayette County, Ohio